Star Gazers' Stone located on Star Gazers' Farm near Embreeville, Pennsylvania, USA, marks the site of a temporary observatory established in January 1764 by Charles Mason and Jeremiah Dixon which they used in their survey of the Mason-Dixon line. The farm, including the house and stone, were listed on the National Register of Historic Places on May 9, 1985. In 2013 construction was completed on a parking area to allow public access to Star Gazers Stone. 

Built c. 1724 near the forks of the Brandywine, the Harlan House was enlarged c.1758, and is likely the first house built in Newlin Township.  The Harlan family lived in the house until 1956, and carefully preserved the location of the stone through the generations.

The observatory
Mason and Dixon's survey was the final step in the resolution of a border dispute between Pennsylvania and Maryland that lasted over 80 years. From 1730-1738 a violent border conflict, known as Cresap's War, was fought  between Pennsylvania and Maryland. The proprietors of the colonies, the Penns and Calverts, then commissioned  Mason and Dixon to survey the newly established boundary.

Mason and Dixon used the finest instruments of their day in the survey, including a type of telescope, the zenith sector built by John Bird, used for measuring latitude and an "equal altitude and transit" instrument for sighting survey lines, as well as a less accurate quadrant for faster rough estimates of latitude, and a chronometer built by John Harrison, used for measuring longitude.  Though Harrison's chronometers later became the standard instrument for measuring longitude, the surveyors' job was mainly to measure latitude, and Mason preferred the method of lunar distance of measuring longitude to the new method.

On December 9, 1763 soon after arriving in Philadelphia, the surveyors received their instructions from the joint border commission:

The first instruction was completed by January 6, 1764 by constructing an observatory near the  Huddle-Plumstead House on Cedar Street (now named South Street) in Philadelphia, and measuring the angle of the zenith of eight stars.  Rather than measure  directly south of Philadelphia to start the survey, a westward move was needed to avoid crossing the wide Delaware River twice, and to avoid beginning the survey of the Pennsylvania-Maryland border in New Jersey.
The surveyors fulfilled the second instruction by January 13, as recorded in their journal:

The new site of the observatory was near marks that had been made by surveyors from New Jersey in 1730 and 1736.
By February 28  Mason and Dixon had determined the latitude at Star Gazers' Stone by observing the eight stars. In the first mile measuring south from their observatory they crossed Brandywine Creek three times. They moved the observatory to this point where they measured the latitude again and remeasured back to the Star Gazers' Stone. In May and June they again measured the latitude at Star Gazers' Stone. The southern point was named the "Post mark'd west" and the Maryland-Pennsylvania border was, after a delay, measured straight west from there.

Mason and Dixon returned to the house many times during the four and one-half years of the survey, often spending the winters there.  On January 1, 1767, Mason recorded a temperature of minus 22 degrees Fahrenheit at the farm.  They returned to the observatory when they started the new task of measuring the distance of a degree of latitude in miles.  They were reputed to be heavy drinkers, and local lore says that a nearby tributary of the Brandywine, Punch Run Creek, was named to commemorate their drinking.  At the end of the survey, the Harlan house was one of the last places they visited before returning to Britain via Philadelphia.

The Harlan house and farm

Brothers George and Michael Harlan were Quakers who were born in Durham, England and immigrated to Pennsylvania about 1687 from County Down, Ireland.  Michael's son George Harlan built the house in the forks of the Brandywine c.1724.   In that year the Free Society of Traders sold  to Nathaniel Newlin, which became Newlin Township in Chester County.  Newlin immediately sold some of the land, including  in the forks of Brandywine Creek sold to George Harlan. A son, Joel, was born to George and Mary Harlan in 1724 in Newlin Township, presumably in their new house.  The house was probably the first in the township. Tax assessments in the township were first made in 1739, and until 1760, Joel's older brother  John Harlan paid the taxes on the house and farm. Sometime between 1758 and 1760  Joel returned to Newlin Township after living in other locations in Chester County, took ownership of the farm and built an addition to the house. Both John's and Joel's families apparently lived in the same house, but Mason and Dixon's Journal always refers to the "John Harland farm" or simply the "Harland farm." John Harlan died by drowning in the Brandywine in 1768. 
A small frame addition was built in the nineteenth century.

The Harlan family lived on site until they sold the property in 1956.  In 1908 the Chester County Historical Society dug up the Star Gazers' Stone, set it in concrete, built a low stone wall around it, and placed a plaque on the new wall. At the dedication, Henry K. Harlan said that each generation of the family was taught that the Star Gazers'  Stone had an important place in American history and that they should not move the stone.  Natural Lands, the region's foremost land conservation organization, now owns the stone as part of ChesLen Preserve, which is open to the public.

See also
 Josiah Harlan - Joel's grandson
Mason and Dixon Survey Terminal Point
Natural Lands
Penn–Calvert boundary dispute
White Clay Creek State Park, site of "Post mark'd west"

References

Sources 

 p. 158

, Chapter: John Russell Hayes - Star Gazers' Stone, pp 93–101. 
Roby, Thomas C. (1984), National Register of Historic Places, [ Inventory - Nomination Form, Star Gazers House]. pp. 6. Enter "public" for ID and "public" for password to access the site.

External links 

Historical markers database
History and Genealogy of the  Harlan Family 
 History and Heritage of Civil Engineering - Mason-Dixon Line
Zenith Sector by John Bird

Buildings and structures on the National Register of Historic Places in Pennsylvania
Buildings and structures in Chester County, Pennsylvania
Surveying of the United States
History of the Thirteen Colonies
National Register of Historic Places in Chester County, Pennsylvania
Mason–Dixon line